August Schmidt may refer to:
 August Schmidt (Wehrmacht) (1892–1972), German general
 August Schmidt (Luftwaffe) (1883–1955), German general
 August Schmidt (journalist) (1808–1891), Austrian music writer, journalist and musician
 Carl August von Schmidt or August Schmidt (1840–1929), German geophysicist and meteorologist